New York, often called New York state to distinguish it from its largest city, New York City, is a state in the Northeastern United States. With 20.2 million people enumerated at the 2020 United States census, its highest decennial count ever, it is the fourth-most populous state in the United States , approximately 44% of the state's population lives in New York City, including 25% in the boroughs of Brooklyn and Queens; and 15% of the state's population is on the remainder of Long Island, the most populous island in the United States. The state is bordered by New Jersey and Pennsylvania to its south, and Connecticut, Massachusetts, and Vermont to its east; it shares a maritime border with Rhode Island, east of Long Island; and an international border with the Canadian provinces of Quebec to its north and Ontario to its northwest.

New York City is the most populous city in the United States, and around two-thirds of the state's population lives in the New York metropolitan area, the world's most sprawling urban landmass. New York City is home to the headquarters of the United Nations, and has been described as the cultural, financial, and media capital of the world, the world's most economically powerful city, and has sometimes been described as the capital of the world. The next five most populous cities in the state are Buffalo, Yonkers, Rochester, Syracuse, and the state capital of Albany. 

New York has a varied geography. The southeastern part of the state, the area known as Downstate, includes Long Island, several smaller associated islands, and New York City and the lower Hudson River Valley. The much larger Upstate New York area spreads from the Great Lakes to Lake Champlain, while its Southern Tier region extends to the border of Pennsylvania. Upstate includes a diverse topography and range of regions including the Adirondack Mountains in the northeastern lobe of the state and the Catskill Mountains in the southeastern part of the state. New York also includes several ranges of the wider Appalachian Mountains. The east–west Mohawk River Valley is the primary river valley bisecting more mountainous regions, and connects to the north–south Hudson River valley in the Capital Region of New York. Western New York is part of the Great Lakes region and borders the Great Lakes of Lake Ontario and Lake Erie, as well as Niagara Falls. Between the central and western parts of the state, New York is dominated by the Finger Lakes, a popular vacation and tourist destination.

New York was one of the original Thirteen Colonies forming the United States. The area of present-day New York had been inhabited by tribes of the Algonquians and the Iroquois confederacy Native Americans for several thousand years by the time the earliest Europeans arrived. French colonists and Jesuit missionaries arrived southward from Montreal, Canada for trade and proselytizing. In 1609, the region was visited by Henry Hudson sailing for the Dutch East India Company. The Dutch built Fort Nassau in 1614 at the confluence of the Hudson and Mohawk rivers, where the present-day capital of Albany later developed.

The Dutch soon also settled New Amsterdam and parts of the Hudson Valley, establishing the multiethnic colony of New Netherland, a center of trade and immigration. England seized the colony from the Dutch in 1664, with the Dutch recapturing their colony in 1673 before definitively ceding it to the English as a part of the Treaty of Westminster the following year. During the American Revolutionary War (1775–1783), a group of colonists of the Province of New York attempted to take control of the British colony and eventually succeeded in establishing independence. In the early 19th century, New York's development of its interior, beginning with the Erie Canal, gave it incomparable advantages over other regions of the east coast and built its political and cultural ascendancy.

Many landmarks in New York are well known, including four of the world's ten most-visited tourist attractions in 2013: Times Square, Central Park, Niagara Falls, and Grand Central Terminal. New York is also home to the Statue of Liberty, a UNESCO World Heritage Site. In the 21st century, New York has emerged as a global node of creativity and entrepreneurship, social tolerance, and environmental sustainability. 

New York state is home to two Ivy League universities, Columbia University in New York City and Cornell University in Ithaca, both of which routinely rank among the top universities in the world. The state has approximately 200 colleges and universities, including the expansive State University of New York, the largest university system in the nation.

History

Native American history
The tribes in what is now New York were predominantly Iroquois (Haudenosaunee) and Algonquian. Long Island was divided roughly in half between the Algonquian Wampanoag and Lenape peoples. The Lenape also controlled most of the region surrounding New York Harbor. North of the Lenape was a third Algonquian nation, the Mohicans. Starting north of them, from east to west, were three Iroquoian nations: the Mohawk—part of the original Iroquois Five Nations, and the Petun. South of them, divided roughly along Appalachia, were the Susquehannock and the Erie.

Many of the Wampanoag and Mohican peoples were caught up in King Philip's War, a joint effort of many New England tribes to push Europeans off their land. After the death of their leader, Chief Philip Metacomet, most of those peoples fled inland, splitting into the Abenaki and the Schaghticoke. Many of the Mohicans remained in the region until the 1800s, however, a small group known as the Ouabano migrated southwest into West Virginia at an earlier time. They may have merged with the Shawnee.

The Mohawk and Susquehannock were the most militaristic. Trying to corner trade with the Europeans, they targeted other tribes. The Mohawk were also known for refusing white settlement on their land and discriminating against any of their people who converted to Christianity. They posed a major threat to the Abenaki and Mohicans, while the Susquehannock briefly conquered the Lenape in the 1600s. The most devastating event of the century, however, was the Beaver Wars.

From approximately 1640–1680, the Iroquois peoples waged campaigns which extended from modern-day Michigan to Virginia against Algonquian and Siouan tribes, as well as each other. The aim was to control more land for animal trapping, a career most natives had turned to in hopes of trading with whites first. This completely changed the ethnography of the region, and most large game was hunted out before whites ever fully explored the land. Still, afterward, the Iroquois Confederacy offered shelter to refugees of the Mascouten, Erie, Chonnonton, Tutelo, Saponi, and Tuscarora nations. The Tuscarora became the sixth nation of the Iroquois.

In the 1700s, Iroquoian peoples would also merge with the Iroquois during the French and Indian War. The Iroquois would take in the remaining Susquehannock of Pennsylvania after they were decimated in war. Most of these other groups assimilated and eventually ceased to exist. Then, after the American Revolution, a large group of Seneca split off and returned to Ohio, becoming known as the Mingo Seneca. The current Six Nations of the Iroquois Confederacy include the Seneca, Cayuga, Onondaga, Oneida, Tuscarora and Mohawk. The Iroquois fought for both sides during the Revolutionary War; afterwards many pro-British Iroquois migrated to Canada. Today, the Iroquois still live in several enclaves across New York and Ontario.

Meanwhile, the Lenape formed a close relationship with William Penn. However, upon Penn's death, his sons managed to take over much of their lands and banish them to Ohio. When the U.S. drafted the Indian Removal Act, the Lenape were further moved to Missouri, whereas their cousins, the Mohicans, were sent to Wisconsin.

Also, in 1778, the United States relocated the Nanticoke from the Delmarva Peninsula to the former Iroquois lands south of Lake Ontario, though they did not stay long. Mostly, they chose to migrate into Canada and merge with the Iroquois, although some moved west and merged with the Lenape.

16th century

In 1524, Giovanni da Verrazzano, an Italian explorer in the service of the French crown, explored the Atlantic coast of North America between the Carolinas and Newfoundland, including New York Harbor and Narragansett Bay. On April 17, 1524, Verrazzano entered New York Bay, by way of the strait now called the Narrows into the northern bay which he named Santa Margherita, in honor of the King of France's sister. Verrazzano described it as "a vast coastline with a deep delta in which every kind of ship could pass" and he adds: "that it extends inland for a league and opens up to form a beautiful lake. This vast sheet of water swarmed with native boats." He landed on the tip of Manhattan and possibly on the furthest point of Long Island. Verrazzano's stay was interrupted by a storm which pushed him north towards Martha's Vineyard.

In 1540, French traders from New France built a chateau on Castle Island, within present-day Albany; it was abandoned the following year due to flooding. In 1614, the Dutch, under the command of Hendrick Corstiaensen, rebuilt the French chateau, which they called Fort Nassau. Fort Nassau was the first Dutch settlement in North America, and was located along the Hudson River, also within present-day Albany. The small fort served as a trading post and warehouse. Located on the Hudson River flood plain, the rudimentary fort was washed away by flooding in 1617, and abandoned for good after Fort Orange (New Netherland) was built nearby in 1623.

17th century

Henry Hudson's 1609 voyage marked the beginning of European involvement in the area. Sailing for the Dutch East India Company and looking for a passage to Asia, he entered the Upper New York Bay on September 11 of that year. Word of his findings encouraged Dutch merchants to explore the coast in search of profitable fur trading with local Native American tribes.

During the 17th century, Dutch trading posts established for the trade of pelts from the Lenape, Iroquois, and other tribes were founded in the colony of New Netherland. The first of these trading posts were Fort Nassau (1614, near present-day Albany); Fort Orange (1624, on the Hudson River just south of the current city of Albany and created to replace Fort Nassau), developing into settlement Beverwijck (1647), and into what became Albany; Fort Amsterdam (1625, to develop into the town New Amsterdam which is present-day New York City); and Esopus (1653, now Kingston). The success of the patroonship of Rensselaerswyck (1630), which surrounded Albany and lasted until the mid-19th century, was also a key factor in the early success of the colony. The English captured the colony during the Second Anglo-Dutch War and governed it as the Province of New York. The city of New York was recaptured by the Dutch in 1673 during the Third Anglo-Dutch War (1672–1674) and renamed New Orange. It was returned to the English under the terms of the Treaty of Westminster a year later.

18th century, the American Revolution, and statehood
The Sons of Liberty were organized in New York City during the 1760s, largely in response to the oppressive Stamp Act passed by the British Parliament in 1765. The Stamp Act Congress met in the city on October 19 of that year, composed of representatives from across the Thirteen Colonies who set the stage for the Continental Congress to follow. The Stamp Act Congress resulted in the Declaration of Rights and Grievances, which was the first written expression by representatives of the Americans of many of the rights and complaints later expressed in the United States Declaration of Independence. This included the right to representative government. At the same time, given strong commercial, personal and sentimental links to Britain, many New York residents were Loyalists. The Capture of Fort Ticonderoga provided the cannon and gunpowder necessary to force a British withdrawal from the siege of Boston in 1775.

New York was the only colony not to vote for independence, as the delegates were not authorized to do so. New York then endorsed the Declaration of Independence on July 9, 1776. The New York State Constitution was framed by a convention which assembled at White Plains on July 10, 1776, and after repeated adjournments and changes of location, finished its work at Kingston on Sunday evening, April 20, 1777, when the new constitution drafted by John Jay was adopted with but one dissenting vote. It was not submitted to the people for ratification. On July 30, 1777, George Clinton was inaugurated as the first Governor of New York at Kingston.

About a third of the battles of the American Revolutionary War took place in New York; the first major one (and largest of the entire war) was the Battle of Long Island, a.k.a. Battle of Brooklyn, in August 1776. After their victory, the British occupied New York City, making it their military and political base of operations in North America for the duration of the conflict, and consequently the focus of General George Washington's intelligence network. On the notorious British prison ships of Wallabout Bay, more American combatants died than were killed in combat in every battle of the war combined. Both sides of combatants lost more soldiers to disease than to outright wounds. The first of two major British armies were captured by the Continental Army at the Battle of Saratoga in 1777, a success that influenced France to ally with the revolutionaries; the state constitution was enacted in 1777. New York became the 11th state to ratify the United States Constitution, on July 26, 1788.

In an attempt to retain their sovereignty and remain an independent nation positioned between the new United States and British North America, four of the Iroquois Nations fought on the side of the British; only the Oneida and their dependents, the Tuscarora, allied themselves with the Americans. In retaliation for attacks on the frontier led by Joseph Brant and Loyalist Mohawk forces, the Sullivan Expedition of 1779 destroyed nearly 50 Iroquois villages, adjacent croplands and winter stores, forcing many refugees to British-held Niagara.

As allies of the British, the Iroquois were forced out of New York, although they had not been part of treaty negotiations. They resettled in Canada after the war and were given land grants by the Crown. In the treaty settlement, the British ceded most Indian lands to the new United States. Because New York made a treaty with the Iroquois without getting Congressional approval, some of the land purchases have been subject to land claim suits since the late 20th century by the federally recognized tribes. As per the Treaty of Paris, the last vestige of British authority in the former Thirteen Colonies—their troops in New York City—departed in 1783, which was long afterward celebrated as Evacuation Day.

New York City was the national capital under the Articles of Confederation and Perpetual Union, the first national government. That organization was found to be inadequate, and prominent New Yorker Alexander Hamilton advocated for a new government that would include an executive, national courts, and the power to tax. Hamilton led the Annapolis Convention (1786) that called for the Philadelphia Convention, which drafted the United States Constitution, in which he also took part. The new government was to be a strong federal national government to replace the relatively weaker confederation of individual states. Following heated debate, which included the publication of the now quintessential constitutional interpretation—The Federalist Papers—as a series of installments in New York City newspapers, New York was the 11th state to ratify the United States Constitution, on July 26, 1788. New York City in New York remained the national capital under the new constitution until 1790, and was the site of the inauguration of President George Washington, the drafting of the United States Bill of Rights, and the first session of the United States Supreme Court.

Both the Dutch and the British imported African slaves as laborers to the city and colony; New York, with its high population, had the second-highest population of slaves after Charleston, South Carolina. Slavery was extensive in New York City and some agricultural areas. The state passed a law for the gradual abolition of slavery soon after the Revolutionary War, but the last slave in New York was not freed until 1827.

19th and 20th century

Transportation in Western New York was by expensive wagons on muddy roads before canals opened up the rich farmlands to long-distance traffic. Governor DeWitt Clinton promoted the Erie Canal, which connected New York City to the Great Lakes by the Hudson River, the new canal, and the rivers and lakes. Work commenced in 1817, and the Erie Canal opened in 1825. Packet boats pulled by horses on tow paths traveled slowly over the canal carrying passengers and freight. Farm products came in from the Midwest, and finished manufactured goods moved west. It was an engineering marvel which opened up vast areas of New York to commerce and settlement. It enabled Great Lakes port cities such as Buffalo and Rochester to grow and prosper. It also connected the burgeoning agricultural production of the Midwest and shipping on the Great Lakes, with the port of New York City. Improving transportation, it enabled additional population migration to territories west of New York. After 1850, railroads largely replaced the canal.

New York City was a major ocean port and had extensive traffic importing cotton from the South and exporting manufacturing goods. Nearly half of the state's exports were related to cotton. Southern cotton factors, planters and bankers visited so often that they had favorite hotels. At the same time, activism for abolitionism was strong upstate, where some communities provided stops on the Underground Railroad. Upstate, and New York City, gave strong support for the American Civil War, in terms of finances, volunteer soldiers, and supplies. The state provided more than 370,000 soldiers to the Union armies. Over 53,000 New Yorkers died in service, roughly one of every seven who served. However, Irish draft riots in 1862 were a significant embarrassment.

Immigration

Since the early 19th century, New York City has been the largest port of entry for legal immigration into the United States. In the United States, the federal government did not assume direct jurisdiction for immigration until 1890. Prior to this time, the matter was delegated to the individual states, then via contract between the states and the federal government. Most immigrants to New York would disembark at the bustling docks along the Hudson and East Rivers, in the eventual Lower Manhattan. On May 4, 1847, the New York State Legislature created the Board of Commissioners of Immigration to regulate immigration.

The first permanent immigration depot in New York was established in 1855 at Castle Garden, a converted War of 1812 era fort located within what is now Battery Park, at the tip of Lower Manhattan. The first immigrants to arrive at the new depot were aboard three ships that had just been released from quarantine. Castle Garden served as New York's immigrant depot until it closed on April 18, 1890, when the federal government assumed control over immigration. During that period, more than eight million immigrants passed through its doors (two of every three U.S. immigrants).

When the federal government assumed control, it established the Bureau of Immigration, which chose the three-acre Ellis Island in Upper New York Harbor for an entry depot. Already federally controlled, the island had served as an ammunition depot. It was chosen due its relative isolation with proximity to New York City and the rail lines of Jersey City, New Jersey, via a short ferry ride. While the island was being developed and expanded via land reclamation, the federal government operated a temporary depot at the Barge Office at the Battery.

Ellis Island opened on January 1, 1892, and operated as a central immigration center until the National Origins Act was passed in 1924, reducing immigration. After that date, the only immigrants to pass through were displaced persons or war refugees. The island ceased all immigration processing on November 12, 1954, when the last person detained on the island, Norwegian seaman Arne Peterssen, was released. He had overstayed his shore leave and left on the 10:15a.m. Manhattan-bound ferry to return to his ship.

More than 12 million immigrants passed through Ellis Island between 1892 and 1954. More than a hundred million Americans across the United States can trace their ancestry to these immigrants. Ellis Island was the subject of a contentious and long-running border and jurisdictional dispute between the State of New York and the State of New Jersey, as both claimed it. The issue was settled in 1998 by the U.S. Supreme Court which ruled that the original  island was New York state territory and that the balance of the  added after 1834 by landfill was in New Jersey. The island was added to the National Park Service system in May 1965 by President Lyndon B. Johnson and is still owned by the federal government as part of the Statue of Liberty National Monument. Ellis Island was opened to the public as a museum of immigration in 1990.

Since the 20th century

9/11 attacks (2001)

On September 11, 2001, two of four hijacked planes were flown into the Twin Towers of the original World Trade Center in Lower Manhattan, and the towers collapsed. 7 World Trade Center also collapsed due to damage from fires. The other buildings of the World Trade Center complex were damaged beyond repair and demolished soon thereafter. The collapse of the Twin Towers caused extensive damage and resulted in the deaths of 2,753 victims, including 147 aboard the two planes. Since September11, most of Lower Manhattan has been restored. In the years since, over 7,000 rescue workers and residents of the area have developed several life-threatening illnesses, and some have died.

A memorial at the site, the National September 11 Memorial & Museum, was opened to the public on September11, 2011. A permanent museum later opened at the site on March 21, 2014. From 2006 to 2018, 3 World Trade Center, 4 World Trade Center, 7World Trade Center, the World Trade Center Transportation Hub, Liberty Park, and Fiterman Hall were completed. St. Nicholas Greek Orthodox Church and Ronald O. Perelman Performing Arts Center are under construction at the World Trade Center site.

Hurricane Sandy (2012)

On October 29 and 30, 2012, Hurricane Sandy caused extensive destruction of the state's shorelines, ravaging portions of New York City, Long Island, and southern Westchester with record-high storm surge, with severe flooding and high winds causing power outages for hundreds of thousands of New Yorkers, and leading to gasoline shortages and disruption of mass transit systems. The storm and its profound effects have prompted the discussion of constructing seawalls and other coastal barriers around the shorelines of New York City and Long Island to minimize the risk from another such future event. Such risk is considered highly probable due to global warming and rising sea levels.

COVID-19 pandemic (2020–present)

On March 1, 2020, New York had its first confirmed case of COVID-19 after Washington (state), a previous two months ago. Since March 28, New York had the highest number of confirmed cases of any state in the United States, which is outpaced the state as of February 1, 2021. Nearly 50 percent of known national cases were in the state as of March 2020, with one-third of total known U.S. cases being in New York City.

From May 19–20, Western New York and the Capital Region entered Phase1 of reopening. On May 26, the Hudson Valley began Phase1, and New York City partially reopened on June 8.

During July 2020, a federal judge ruled Governor Andrew Cuomo and Mayor Bill de Blasio exceeded authority by limiting religious gatherings to 25% when others operated at 50% capacity. On Thanksgiving Eve, the U.S. Supreme Court blocked additional religious restrictions imposed by Cuomo for areas with high infection rates.

New York's government released a new seal, coat of arms, and flag in April 2020, adding "E pluribus unum" below the state's motto. A bill utilizing newly designed flag, arms and seal went into effect in September.

Geography

The state of New York covers a total area of 54,555 square miles (141,297 km2) and ranks as the 27th largest state by size.

In contrast with New York City's urban landscape, the vast majority of the state's geographic area is dominated by meadows, forests, rivers, farms, mountains, and lakes. Most of the southern part of the state rests on the Allegheny Plateau, which extends from the southeastern United States to the Catskill Mountains; the section in the State of New York is known as the Southern Tier. The rugged Adirondack Mountains, with vast tracts of wilderness, lie west of the Lake Champlain Valley. The Great Appalachian Valley dominates eastern New York and contains Lake Champlain Valley as its northern half and the Hudson Valley as its southern half within the state. The Tug Hill region arises as a cuesta east of Lake Ontario. The state of New York contains a part of the Marcellus shale, which extends into Ohio and Pennsylvania.

Upstate and Downstate are often used informally to distinguish New York City or its greater metropolitan area from the rest of the State of New York. The placement of a boundary between the two is a matter of great contention. Unofficial and loosely defined regions of Upstate New York include from the Southern Tier, which includes many of the counties along the border with Pennsylvania, to the North Country region, above or sometimes including parts of the Adirondack region.

Water

Borders

Of the State of New York's total area, 13.6% consists of water. Much of New York's boundaries are in water, as is true for New York City: four of its five boroughs are situated on three islands at the mouth of the Hudson River: Manhattan Island; Staten Island; and Long Island, which contains Brooklyn and Queens at its western end. The state's borders include a water boundary in (clockwise from the west) two Great Lakes (Lake Erie and Lake Ontario, which are connected by the Niagara River); the provinces of Ontario and Quebec in Canada, with New York and Ontario sharing the Thousand Islands archipelago within the Saint Lawrence River, while most of its border with Quebec is on land; it shares Lake Champlain with the New England state of Vermont; the New England state of Massachusetts has mostly a land border; New York extends into Long Island Sound and the Atlantic Ocean, sharing a water border with Rhode Island, while Connecticut has land and sea borders. Except for areas near the New York Harbor and the Upper Delaware River, New York has a mostly land border with two Mid-Atlantic states, New Jersey and Pennsylvania. New York is the only state that includes within its borders parts of the Great Lakes and the Atlantic Ocean.

Drainage
The Hudson River begins near Lake Tear of the Clouds and flows south through the eastern part of the state, without draining Lakes George or Champlain. Lake George empties at its north end into Lake Champlain, whose northern end extends into Canada, where it drains into the Richelieu River and then ultimately the Saint Lawrence River. The western section of the state is drained by the Allegheny River and rivers of the Susquehanna and Delaware River systems. Niagara Falls is shared between New York and Ontario as it flows on the Niagara River from Lake Erie to Lake Ontario. The Delaware River Basin Compact, signed in 1961 by New York, New Jersey, Pennsylvania, Delaware, and the federal government, regulates the utilization of water of the Delaware system.

Climate

In general, New York has a humid continental climate, though under the Köppen climate classification, New York City and Long Island have a humid subtropical climate. Weather in New York is heavily influenced by two continental air masses: a warm, humid one from the southwest and a cold, dry one from the northwest. Downstate New York (comprising New York City, Long Island, and lower portions of the Hudson Valley) have rather hot summers with some periods of high humidity and cold, damp winters which are relatively mild compared to temperatures in Upstate New York, due to the downstate region's lower elevation, proximity to the Atlantic Ocean, and relatively lower latitude.

Upstate New York experiences warm summers, marred by only occasional, brief intervals of sultry conditions, with long and cold winters. Western New York, particularly the Tug Hill region, receives heavy lake-effect snows, especially during the earlier portions of winter, before the surface of Lake Ontario itself is covered by ice. The summer climate is cool in the Adirondacks, Catskills, and at higher elevations of the Southern Tier. Buffalo and its metropolitan area are described as climate change havens for their weather pattern in Western New York.

Summer daytime temperatures range from the high 70s to low 80s°F (25 to 28°C), over most of the state. New York had a record-high temperature of 108°F (42.2°C) on July 22, 1926. Its record-lowest temperature during the winter was −52°F (−46.7°C) in 1979. Governors Island, Manhattan, in New York Harbor, is planned to host a US$1 billion research and education center poised to make New York the global leader in addressing the climate crisis.

Flora and fauna
Due to New York's relatively large land area and unique geography compared to other eastern states, there are several distinct ecoregions present in the state, many of them reduced heavily due to urbanization and other human activities: Southern Great Lakes forests (western New York), New England–Acadian forests (fringes on the New England border), Northeastern coastal forests (much of the lower Hudson Valley and western Long Island), Atlantic coastal pine barrens (small pockets of southern Long Island), Northeastern interior dry–mesic oak forest (eastern Southern Tier and upper Hudson Valley), Appalachian–Blue Ridge forests (pockets in the Hudson Valley), Central Appalachian dry oak–pine forest (also around the Hudson Valley), Eastern Great Lakes and Hudson Lowlands, Eastern forest–boreal transition (Adirondacks), Eastern Great Lakes lowland forests (around the Adirondacks), and Allegheny Highlands forests (most of the western Southern Tier).

Some species that can be found in this state are American ginseng, starry stonewort, waterthyme, water chestnut, eastern poison ivy, poison sumac, giant hogweed, cow parsnip and common nettle. There are more than 70 mammal species, more than 20 bird species, some species of amphibians, and several reptile species.

Species of mammals that are found in New York are the white-footed mouse, North American least shrew, little brown bat, muskrat, eastern gray squirrel, eastern cottontail, American ermine, groundhog, striped skunk, fisher, North American river otter, raccoon, bobcat, eastern coyote, red fox, gray fox white-tailed deer, moose, and American black bear; extirpated mammals include Canada lynx, American bison, wolverine, Allegheny woodrat, caribou, eastern elk, eastern cougar, and eastern wolf. Some species of birds in New York are the ring-necked pheasant, northern bobwhite, ruffed grouse, spruce grouse, Canada jay, wild turkey, blue jay, eastern bluebird (the state bird), American robin, and black-capped chickadee.

Birds of prey that are present in the state are great horned owls, bald eagles, red-tailed hawks, American kestrels, and northern harriers. Waterfowl like mallards, wood ducks, canvasbacks, American black ducks, trumpeter swans, Canada geese, and blue-winged teals can be found in the region. Maritime or shore birds of New York are great blue heron, killdeers, northern cardinals, American herring gulls, and common terns. Reptile and amphibian species that can be seen in land areas of New York are queen snakes, massassaugas, hellbenders, diamondback terrapins, timber rattlesnakes, eastern fence lizards, spotted turtles, and Blanding's turtles. Sea turtles that can be found in the state are the green sea turtle, loggerhead sea turtle, leatherback sea turtle and Kemp's ridley sea turtle. New York Harbor and the Hudson River constitute an estuary, making the state of New York home to a rich array of marine life including shellfish—such as oysters and clams—as well as fish, microorganisms, and sea-birds.

Regions

Due to its long history, New York has several overlapping and often conflicting definitions of regions within the state. The regions are also not fully definable due to the colloquial use of regional labels. The New York State Department of Economic Development provides two distinct definitions of these regions. It divides the state into ten economic regions, which approximately correspond to terminology used by residents:

 Western New York
 Finger Lakes
 Southern Tier
 Central New York
 North Country
 Mohawk Valley
 Capital District
 Hudson Valley
 New York City
 Long Island

The department also groups the counties into eleven regions for tourism purposes:

 Chautauqua–Allegheny
 Niagara Frontier
 Finger Lakes
 Thousand Islands
 Central-Leatherstocking Region
 Adirondack Mountains
 Capital District
 Catskill Mountains
 Hudson Valley
 New York City
 Long Island

State parks

New York has many state parks and two major forest preserves. Niagara Falls State Park, established in 1885, is the oldest state park in the United States and the first to be created via eminent domain. In 1892, Adirondack Park, roughly the size of the state of Vermont and the largest state park in the United States, was established and given state constitutional protection to remain "forever wild" in 1894. The park is larger than Yellowstone, Everglades, Glacier, and Grand Canyon national parks combined. The Catskill Park was protected in legislation passed in 1885, which declared that its land was to be conserved and never put up for sale or lease. There are some 400 black bears living in the region.

The 1797 Montauk Lighthouse, commissioned under President George Washington, is a major tourist attraction in Montauk Point State Park at the easternmost tip of Long Island. Hither Hills State Park, also on the South Fork of Long Island, offers camping and is a popular destination with surfcasting sport fishermen.

National parks, monuments, and historic landmarks

The State of New York is well represented in the National Park System with 22 national parks, which received 16,349,381 visitors in 2011. In addition, there are four national heritage areas, 27 national natural landmarks, 262 national historic landmarks, and 5,379 listings on the National Register of Historic Places. Some major areas, landmarks, and monuments are listed below.
 The Statue of Liberty National Monument includes Ellis Island and the Statue of Liberty. The statue, designed by Frédéric Bartholdi and formally named Liberty Enlightening the World, was a gift from France to the United States to mark the Centennial of the American Declaration of Independence; it was dedicated in New York Harbor on October 28, 1886. It has since become an icon of the United States and the concepts of democracy and freedom.
 The African Burial Ground National Monument in Lower Manhattan is the only national monument dedicated to Americans of African ancestry. It preserves a site containing the remains of more than 400 Africans buried during the late 17th and 18th centuries in a portion of what was the largest colonial-era cemetery for people of African descent, both free and enslaved, with an estimated tens of thousands of remains interred. The site's excavation and study were called "the most important historic urban archeological project in the United States".
The island is part of Suffolk County.
Including areas on Long Island and in New Jersey, it covers more area than that of two Manhattan islands.
 General Grant National Memorial is the final resting place of President Ulysses S. Grant and is the largest mausoleum in North America.
 Hamilton Grange National Memorial preserves the home of Alexander Hamilton, Caribbean immigrant and orphan who rose to be a United States founding father and associate of George Washington.
 The Home of Franklin D. Roosevelt National Historic Site, established in 1945, preserves the Springwood estate in Hyde Park, New York. Springwood was the birthplace, lifelong home, and burial place of the 32nd President of the United States, Franklin D. Roosevelt.
 Niagara Falls National Heritage Area was designated by the U.S. Congress in 2008; it stretches from the western boundary of Wheatfield, New York to the mouth of the Niagara River on Lake Ontario, including the communities of Niagara Falls, Youngstown, and Lewiston. It includes Niagara Falls State Park and Colonial Niagara Historic District. It is managed in collaboration with the state.
 Saratoga National Historical Park preserves the site of the Battles of Saratoga, the first significant American military victory of the American Revolutionary War. In 1777, American forces defeated a major British Army, which led France to recognize the independence of the United States, and enter the war as a decisive military ally of the struggling Americans.
 Stonewall National Monument, in the Greenwich Village neighborhood of Lower Manhattan, is the first U.S. national monument dedicated to LGBTQ rights, designated on June 24, 2016. The monument comprises the area around the still privately operated Stonewall Inn, commonly recognized to be the cradle of the gay liberation movement as the site of the 1969 Stonewall Riots; the adjacent Christopher Park; and surrounding streets and sidewalks.
 Manhattan's Theodore Roosevelt Birthplace National Historic Site is also the childhood home of President Theodore Roosevelt, the only president born in New York City until Donald Trump.

Administrative divisions

New York is divided into 62 counties. Aside from the five counties of New York City, each of these counties is subdivided into towns and cities, incorporated under state law. Towns can contain incorporated villages or unincorporated hamlets. New York City is divided into five boroughs, each coterminous with a county. The major cities of the state developed along the key transportation and trade routes of the early 19th century, including the Erie Canal and railroads paralleling it. Today, the New York Thruway acts as a modern counterpart to commercial water routes. Downstate New York (New York City, Long Island, and the southern portion of the Hudson Valley) can be considered to form the central core of the Northeast megalopolis, an urbanized region stretching from New Hampshire to Virginia.

Cities and towns

The State of New York contains 62 administrative divisions termed cities. The largest city in the state and the most populous city in the United States is New York City, which comprises five counties (each coextensive with a borough): Bronx, New York County (Manhattan), Queens, Kings County (Brooklyn), and Richmond County (Staten Island). New York City is home to more than two-fifths of the state's population. Albany, the state capital, is the sixth-largest city in the State of New York. The smallest city is Sherrill, New York, in Oneida County. Hempstead is the most populous town in the state; if it were a city, it would be the second largest in the State of New York, with more than 700,000 residents. New York contains 13 metropolitan areas, as defined by the U.S. Census Bureau. Major metro areas include New York City, Buffalo, Rochester, the Capital District (Albany, Schenectady, and Troy), Poughkeepsie, Syracuse, Utica, and Binghamton.

Demographics

Population

Having been the most populous state in the U.S. for a century and a half, from the 1810s until 1962, New York is now in fourth place behind California, Texas, and Florida. Growth has been distributed unevenly. The New York City metropolitan area is growing, along with the Buffalo–Niagara Falls metropolitan area, Saratoga County and the remainder of the Capital District; while cities such as Rochester, and Syracuse, among others, have been losing population or essentially stagnant for decades, but have actually grown according to the 2020 census. New York City gained more residents between April 2010 and July 2018 (223,615) than any other U.S. city.

According to immigration statistics, the state is a leading recipient of migrants from around the globe. In 2008 New York had the second-largest international immigrant population in the country among U.S. states, at 4.2million; most reside in and around New York City, due to its size, high profile, vibrant economy, and cosmopolitan culture. New York has a pro-sanctuary city law.

The United States Census Bureau tabulated in the 2020 census that the population of New York was 20,215,751 on April 1, 2020, a 4.3% increase since the 2010 census. Despite the abundance of open land in the state, New York's population is very urban, with 92% of residents living in an urban area, predominantly in the New York City metropolitan area.

Two-thirds of the state's population resides in the New York City metropolitan area. New York City is the most populous city in the United States, with an estimated record high population of 8,622,698 in 2017, incorporating more immigration into the city than emigration since the 2010 United States census. More than twice as many people live in New York City as in the second-most populous U.S. city, Los Angeles, and within a smaller area. Long Island alone accounted for a census-estimated 7,838,722 residents in 2015, representing 39.6% of the State of New York's population. Of the total statewide population, 6.5% of New Yorkers were under five years of age, 24.7% under 18, and 12.9% were 65 or older.

According to HUD's 2022 Annual Homeless Assessment Report, there were an estimated 74,178 homeless people in New York.

Race and ethnicity

The state's historically most populous racial group, non-Hispanic whites, declined as a proportion of the state population from 94.6% in 1940 to 58.3% in 2010. , 55.6% of New York's population younger than age1 were minorities. New York's robustly increasing Jewish population, the largest outside of Israel, was the highest among states both by percentage and by absolute number in 2012. It is driven by the high reproductive rate of Orthodox Jewish families, particularly in Brooklyn and communities of the Hudson Valley.

New York is home to the second-largest Asian American population and the fourth-largest Black or African American population in the United States. New York's Black and African population increased by 2.0% between 2000 and 2010, to 3,073,800. In 2019, the Black and African American population increased to an estimated 3,424,002. The Black or African American population is in a state of flux, as New York is the largest recipient of immigrants from Africa, while established Blacks and African Americans are migrating out of New York to the southern United States. The New York City neighborhood of Harlem has historically been a major cultural capital for Blacks and African Americans of sub-Saharan descent, and Bedford-Stuyvesant in Brooklyn has the largest such population in the United States. Meanwhile, New York's Asian population increased by a notable 36% from 2000 to 2010, to 1,420,244; in 2019, its population grew to an estimated 1,579,494. Queens, in New York City, is home to the state's largest Asian American population and is the most ethnically diverse county in the United States and the most ethnically diverse urban area in the world.

New York's growing Hispanic and Latino American population numbered 3,416,922 in 2010, a 19% increase from the 2,867,583 enumerated in 2000. In 2020, it numbered an estimated 3,811,000. Queens is home to the largest Andean (Colombian, Ecuadorian, Peruvian, and Bolivian) populations in the United States. In addition, New York has the largest Puerto Rican, Dominican, and Jamaican American populations in the continental United States. The Chinese population constitutes the fastest-growing nationality in the State of New York, which is the top destination for new Chinese immigrants, and large-scale Chinese immigration continues into the state. Multiple satellites of the original Manhattan Chinatown, in Brooklyn, and around Flushing, Queens, are thriving as traditionally urban enclaves, while also expanding rapidly eastward into suburban Nassau County, on Long Island. Long Island, including Queens and Nassau County, is also home to several Little Indias and a large Koreatown, with large and growing attendant populations of Indian Americans and Korean Americans, respectively. Brooklyn has been a destination for West Indian immigrants of African descent, as well as Asian Indian immigrants. The annual New York City India Day Parade, held on or approximately every August 15 since 1981, is the world's largest Indian Independence Day parade outside of India.

In the 2000 U.S. census, New York had the largest Italian American population, composing the largest self-identified ancestral group in Staten Island and Long Island, followed by Irish Americans. Albany and the Mohawk Valley also have large communities of ethnic Italians and Irish Americans, reflecting 19th and early 20th-century immigration. According to the 2011-2015 American Community Survey, New York also had the largest Greek American population, enumerating 148,637 individuals (0.7% of the state). In Buffalo and Western New York, German Americans comprise the largest ancestry. In the North Country of New York, French Canadians represent the leading ethnicity, given the area's proximity to Quebec. Americans of English ancestry are present throughout all of upstate New York, reflecting early colonial and later immigrants.

Languages

In 2019, the U.S. Census Bureau reported that 69.5% of New York's population aged 5 years and older only spoke English, with 30.6% speaking a language other than English. Spanish remained the second most spoken non-English language with 2,758,925 speakers. Other Indo-European languages were spoken by 1,587,798 residents, and Asian and Pacific Islander languages were spoken by 948,959 people.

At the American Community Survey's 2017 estimates, nearly six million residents spoke a language other than English. Approximately 1,249,541 New York residents spoke Spanish, 386,290 Chinese, 122,150 Russian, 63,615 Haitian Creole, 62,219 Bengali, and 60,405 Korean. In 2018, 12,756,975 aged 5years and older spoke English alone and 10,415,395 aged 18 and older only spoke English. Spanish-speaking households by majority were not limited to English-speaking. An estimated 2.7million households with residents aged5 and older spoke Spanish. Chinese, Slavic, and French languages were the following largest household languages spoken in 2018.

In 2010, 70.72% (12,788,233) of New York residents aged five and older reported speaking only English at home, while 14.44% (2,611,903) spoke Spanish, 2.61% (472,955) Chinese (which includes Cantonese and Mandarin), 1.20% (216,468) Russian, 1.18% (213,785) Italian, 0.79% (142,169) French Creole, 0.75% (135,789) French, 0.67% (121,917) Yiddish, 0.63% (114,574) Korean, and Polish was spoken by 0.53% (95,413) of the population over the age of five. In total, 29.28% (5,295,016) of New York's population aged five and older reported speaking a language other than English.

In 2010, the most common American English dialects spoken in New York, besides General American English, were the New York City area dialect (including New York Latino English and North Jersey English), the Western New England accent around Albany, and Inland Northern American English in Buffalo and western New York State. As many as 800 languages are spoken in New York City, making it the most linguistically diverse city in the world.

Sexual orientation and gender identity

Roughly 3.8 percent of the state's adult population self-identifies as lesbian, gay, bisexual, or transgender. This constitutes a total LGBT adult population of 570,388 individuals. In 2010, the number of same-sex couple households stood at roughly 48,932. New York was the fifth state to license same-sex marriages, after New Hampshire. Same-sex marriages in New York were legalized on June 24, 2011, and were authorized to take place beginning thirty days thereafter.

New York City has been described as the gay capital of the world, and is home to one of the world’s largest LGBTQ populations and the most prominent. Michael Bloomberg, the Mayor of New York City, said "same-sex marriages in New York City had generated an estimated $259million in economic impact and $16million in City revenues" in the first year after enactment of the Marriage Equality Act.  New York City is also home to the largest transgender population in the United States, estimated at 25,000 in 2016. The annual New York City Pride March (or gay pride parade) traverses southward down Fifth Avenue in Manhattan, ending at Greenwich Village, and is the largest pride parade in the world, attracting tens of thousands of participants and millions of sidewalk spectators each June. LGBT travel guide Queer in the World states, "The fabulosity of Gay New York is unrivaled on Earth, and queer culture seeps into every corner of its five boroughs"; LGBT advocate and entertainer Madonna stated metaphorically, “Anyways, not only is New York City the best place in the world because of the queer people here. Let me tell you something, if you can make it here, then you must be queer.”

The Stonewall riots were a series of spontaneous, violent protests by members of the gay community against a police raid that took place in the early morning hours of June 28, 1969, at the Stonewall Inn in the Greenwich Village neighborhood within Lower Manhattan. They are widely considered to constitute the single most important event leading to the gay liberation movement, and the modern fight for LGBT rights. In June 2017, plans were announced for the first official monument to LGBT individuals commissioned by the State of New York, in contrast to the Stonewall National Monument, which was commissioned by the U.S. federal government. The state monument was planned to be built in Hudson River Park in Manhattan, near the waterfront Hudson River piers which have served as historically significant symbols of New York's central role as a meeting place and a safe haven for LGBT communities. Meanwhile, the State of New York's capital city of Albany annually hold the largest LGBTQ+ pride parade in Upstate New York.

Stonewall 50 – WorldPride NYC 2019 commemorated the 50th anniversary of the Stonewall Riots and was the largest LGBTQ+ pride event in world history, attracting 5 million spectators in New York City. In New York City, the Stonewall 50–WorldPride NYC 2019 events produced by Heritage of Pride were enhanced through a partnership made with the I LOVE NY program's LGBT division and included a welcome center during the weeks surrounding the Stonewall 50 / WorldPride events that was open to all. Additional commemorative arts, cultural, and educational programming to mark the 50th anniversary of the rebellion at the Stonewall Inn took place throughout the city and the world; Stonewall 50 – WorldPride NYC 2019 was the largest LGBT pride celebration held in history, drawing an estimated five million people. Brooklyn Liberation March, the largest transgender-rights demonstration in LGBTQ history, took place on June 14, 2020, stretching from Grand Army Plaza to Fort Greene, Brooklyn, focused on supporting Black transgender lives, drawing an estimated 15,000 to 20,000 participants.

Religion

Per the Pew Research Center in 2014, the majority of New York's religious population are Christian (60%), followed by the irreligious (27%), Judaism (7%), Islam (2%), Buddhism and Hinduism (1% each), and other faiths (0.5%). Through another study by the Public Religion Research Institute in 2020, the majority of New York's religious or spiritual population were 67% Christian, followed by the irreligious (22%), Judaism (4%), Islam (2%), Buddhism and Hinduism (1% each), and other faiths (1%).

Before the 1800s, Protestant sects dominated the religious life of New York, although religion did not play as large a role in the public life of New Netherland as it did in New England, with its Puritan population. Historically, New York served as the foundation for new Christian denominations in the Second Great Awakening. Non-Western Christian traditions and non-Christian religions did not grow for much of the state's history because immigration was predominantly from Western Europe (favored by the quotas in federal immigration law). The Immigration and Nationality Act of 1965 removed the quotas, allowing for the growth of other religious groups.

The Roman Catholic Church is the largest Christian denomination in New York as of 2014's study (31%). The largest Roman Catholic diocese is the Latin Church's Archdiocese of New York. The largest Eastern Catholic diocese is the Ruthenian Catholic Eparchy of Passaic of the Ruthenian Greek Catholic Church. The United Methodist Church was the largest Mainline Protestant denomination and second largest overall, followed by the Episcopal Church in the U.S. and other Continuing Anglican bodies. The Presbyterian Church (USA), Evangelical Lutheran Church in America, and American Baptist Churches USA were the following largest Mainline denominations. Mainline Protestants together made up 11% of Christians in the state as of 2014. In Evangelical Protestantism the Baptists, non-denominational Protestants, and Pentecostals were the largest groups. The National Baptist Convention (USA) and Progressive National Baptist Convention were the largest historically black Protestant churches in New York. Roughly 10% of Christians in New York identify as Evangelical Protestants as of 2014. Additionally, the Eastern and Oriental Orthodox collectively comprised 1% of the religious demographic alongside Jehovah's Witnesses and other Christians; the Orthodox Christians in 2020's study made up 1% of the population, and Jehovah's Witnesses grew to 1% of the population as well.

Per 2014's study, non-Christian religions accounted for 12% of the population. Judaism is the second largest religion as of 2014 and 2020. In 2010, 588,500 practiced Orthodox Judaism. A little over 392,953 professed Islam. The Powers Street Mosque in New York City was the first Muslim organization in the state. New York is also home to the oldest Zoroastrian fire temple in the United States. Less than 1% of New York's population practice New Age and contemporary paganism. Native American religions are also a prominent minority. Statewide, 17% practiced nothing in particular and 5% each are atheists and agnostic.

Economy

New York's Gross domestic product (GDP) in 2022-Q2 was US$2.0trillion. If the State of New York were an independent nation, it would rank as the 11th largest economy in the world. However, in 2019, the multi-state, New York City-centered metropolitan statistical area produced a gross metropolitan product (GMP) of US$2 trillion, ranking first nationally by a wide margin and behind the GDP of only nine nations.

Wall Street

Anchored by Wall Street in the Financial District of Lower Manhattan, New York City has been called both the most economically powerful city and the leading financial center of the world. Lower Manhattan is the third-largest central business district in the United States and is home to the New York Stock Exchange, on Wall Street, and Nasdaq, at 165 Broadway, representing the world's largest and second largest stock exchanges, respectively, as measured both by overall average daily trading volume and by total market capitalization of their listed companies in 2013.

Investment banking fees on Wall Street totaled approximately $40billion in 2012, while in 2013, senior New York City bank officers who manage risk and compliance functions earned as much as $324,000 annually. In fiscal year 2013–14, Wall Street's securities industry generated 19% of the State of New York's tax revenue. New York City remains the largest global center for trading in public equity and debt capital markets, driven in part by the size and financial development of the U.S. economy. New York also leads in private equity and the monetary volume of mergers and acquisitions. Several investment banks and investment managers headquartered in Manhattan are important participants in other global financial centers. New York is also the principal commercial banking center of the United States.

Many of the world's largest media conglomerates are also based in the city. Manhattan contained approximately 520million square feet (48.1million m2) of office space in 2013, making it the largest office market in the United States, while Midtown Manhattan is the largest central business district in the nation.

High technology

Silicon Alley eastward throughout Long Island

Silicon Alley, once confined to Manhattan, has since evolved into a metonym for the sphere encompassing the New York City metropolitan region's high technology and entrepreneurship ecosystem; in 2015, Silicon Alley generated over $7.3billion in venture capital investment. High tech industries including digital media, biotechnology, software development, game design, and other fields in information technology are growing, bolstered by New York City's position at the terminus of several transatlantic fiber optic trunk lines, its intellectual capital, as well as its growing outdoor wireless connectivity. In December 2014, the State of New York announced a $50million venture-capital fund to encourage enterprises working in biotechnology and advanced materials; according to Governor Andrew Cuomo, the seed money would facilitate entrepreneurs in bringing their research into the marketplace. On December 19, 2011, then Mayor Michael R. Bloomberg announced his choice of Cornell University and Technion-Israel Institute of Technology to build a two billion dollar graduate school of applied sciences on Roosevelt Island in Manhattan, with the goal of transforming New York City into the world's premier technology capital.

Meanwhile, Long Island has become a prominent nexus for STEM-based education and technology. Biotechnology companies and scientific research play a significant role in Long Island's economy, including research facilities at Brookhaven National Laboratory, Cold Spring Harbor Laboratory, Stony Brook University, New York Institute of Technology, Plum Island Animal Disease Center, the New York University Tandon School of Engineering, the City University of New York, the Hofstra Northwell School of Medicine, and the Feinstein Institutes for Medical Research.

Tech Valley

Albany, Saratoga County, Rensselaer County, and the Hudson Valley, collectively recognized as eastern New York's Tech Valley, have experienced significant growth in the computer hardware side of the high-technology industry, with great strides in the nanotechnology sector, digital electronics design, and water- and electricity-dependent integrated microchip circuit manufacturing, involving companies including IBM and its Thomas J. Watson Research Center, and the three foreign-owned firms, GlobalFoundries, Samsung, and Taiwan Semiconductor, among others. The area's high technology ecosystem is supported by technologically focused academic institutions including Rensselaer Polytechnic Institute and the SUNY Polytechnic Institute.

In 2015, Tech Valley, straddling both sides of the Adirondack Northway and the New York Thruway, generated over $163million in venture capital investment. The Rochester area is important in the field of photographic processing and imaging as well as incubating an increasingly diverse high technology sphere encompassing STEM fields, similarly in part the result of private startup enterprises collaborating with major academic institutions, including the University of Rochester and Cornell University. Westchester County has developed a burgeoning biotechnology sector in the 21st century, with over a billion dollars in planned private investment as of 2016. In April 2021, GlobalFoundries, a company specializing in the semiconductor industry, moved its headquarters from Silicon Valley, California to its most advanced semiconductor-chip manufacturing facility in Saratoga County near a section of the Adirondack Northway, in Malta, New York.

Media and entertainment

Creative industries, which are concerned with generating and distributing knowledge and information, such as new media, digital media, film and television production, advertising, fashion, design, and architecture, account for a growing share of employment, with New York City possessing a strong competitive advantage in these industries. , the State of New York was offering tax incentives of up to $420million annually for filmmaking within the state, the most generous such tax rebate among U.S. states. New York has also attracted higher-wage visual-effects employment by further augmenting its tax credit to a maximum of 35% for performing post-film production work in Upstate New York. The filmed entertainment industry has been growing in New York, contributing nearly $9billion to the New York City economy alone as of 2015.

Tourism

I Love New York (stylized I ❤ NY) is a slogan, a logo and state song that are the basis of an advertising campaign and has been used since 1977 to promote tourism in the state of New York, including New York City. The trademarked logo is owned by New York State Empire State Development. The Broadway League reported that Broadway shows sold approximately $1.27billion worth of tickets in the 2013–2014 season, an 11.4% increase from $1.139billion in the 2012–2013 season. Attendance in 2013–2014 stood at 12.21million, representing a 5.5% increase from the 2012–2013 season's 11.57million.

Exports
New York exports a wide variety of goods such as prepared foods, computers and electronics, cut diamonds, and other commodities. In 2007, the state exported a total of $71.1billion worth of goods, with the five largest foreign export markets being Canada ($15billion), the United Kingdom ($6billion), Switzerland ($5.9billion), Israel ($4.9billion), and Hong Kong ($3.4billion). New York's largest imports are oil, gold, aluminum, natural gas, electricity, rough diamonds, and lumber. The state also has a large manufacturing sector that includes printing and the production of garments, mainly in New York City; and furs, railroad equipment, automobile parts, and bus line vehicles, concentrated in Upstate regions.

New York is the nation's third-largest grape producing state, and second-largest wine producer by volume, behind California. The southern Finger Lakes hillsides, the Hudson Valley, the North Fork of Long Island, and the southern shore of Lake Erie are the primary grape- and wine-growing regions in New York, with many vineyards. In 2012, New York had 320 wineries and 37,000 grape bearing acres, generating full-time employment for nearly 25,000 and annual wages over $1.1billion, and yielding $4.8billion in direct economic impact from New York grapes, grape juice, and wine and grape products.

Agriculture
The New York agriculture industry is a major producer overall, ranking among the top five states for agricultural products including maple syrup, apples, cherries, cabbage, dairy products, onions, and potatoes. The state is the largest producer of cabbage in the U.S. The state has about a quarter of its land in farms and produced $3.4billion in agricultural products in 2001. The south shore of Lake Ontario provides the right mix of soils and microclimate for many apple, cherry, plum, pear and peach orchards. Apples are also grown in the Hudson Valley and near Lake Champlain. A moderately sized saltwater commercial fishery is located along the Atlantic side of Long Island. The principal catches by value are clams, lobsters, squid, and flounder.

Energy

In 2017, the State of New York consumed 156,370-gigawatthours (GWh) of electrical energy. Downstate regions (Hudson Valley, New York City, and Long Island) consumed 66% of that amount. Upstate regions produced 50% of that amount. The peak load in 2017 was 29,699 MW. The resource capability in 2017 was 42,839 MW. The NYISO's market monitor described the average all-in wholesale electric price as a range (a single value was not provided) from $25 per MWh to $53 per MWh for 2017.

Education

At the level of post-secondary education, the statewide public university system is the State University of New York (SUNY). The SUNY system consists of 64 community colleges, technical colleges, undergraduate colleges, and doctoral-granting institutions. The SUNY system has four "university centers": Albany (1844), Buffalo (1846), Binghamton (1946), and Stony Brook (1957). The SUNY system is home to three academic medical centers: Renaissance School of Medicine at Stony Brook University in Long Island, Norton College of Medicine at SUNY Upstate Medical University in Syracuse, and SUNY Downstate Medical Center in Brooklyn.

The City University of New York is the public university system of New York City. It is the largest urban university system in the United States, comprising 25 campuses: eleven senior colleges, seven community colleges and seven professional institutions. While its constituent colleges date back as far as 1847, CUNY was established in 1961. The university enrolls more than 275,000 students, and counts thirteen Nobel Prize winners and twenty-four MacArthur Fellows among its alumni.

Cornell University, Columbia University, New York University are among the most selelctive of the larger higher education institutions in New York, all of them leading, world-renowned private universities. Other notable large private universities include Syracuse University and Fordham University. Smaller notable private institutions of higher education include University of Rochester, Rockefeller University, Mercy College, New York Institute of Technology, Rensselaer Polytechnic Institute, Yeshiva University, and Hofstra University. There are also a multitude of postgraduate-level schools in the State of New York, including medical, law, and engineering schools such as New York Medical College and New York Law School.

West Point, the service academy of the U.S. Army, is located just south of Newburgh, on the west bank of the Hudson River. The federal Merchant Marine Academy is at Kings Point on Long Island.

A number of selective private liberal arts institutions are located in New York. Among them are Adelphi University, Bard College, Barnard College, Colgate University, Hamilton College, Hobart and William Smith Colleges, Marist College, Sarah Lawrence College, Skidmore College, Union College, and Vassar College. Two of these schools, Barnard and Vassar, are members of the selective Seven Sisters, originally all women's colleges with ties to the Ivy League. Barnard is affiliated with Columbia University, its Manhattan neighbor, and Vassar became coeducational in 1969 after declining an offer to merge with Yale University.

New York is also home to what are widely regarded as the best performing arts schools in the world. The Juilliard School, located in the Upper West Side of Manhattan, is one of the world's leading music and dance schools. The Eastman School of Music, a professional school within the University of Rochester, was ranked first among U.S. music schools by U.S. News & World Report for five consecutive years.

The University of the State of New York accredits and sets standards for elementary, middle-level, and secondary education in the state, while the New York State Education Department oversees public schools and controls their standardized tests. The New York City Department of Education manages the New York City Public Schools system. In 1894, reflecting general racial discrimination then, the state passed a law that allowed communities to set up separate schools for children of African-American descent. In 1900, the state passed another law requiring integrated schools. During the 2013 fiscal year, New York spent more on public education per pupil than any other state, according to U.S. Census Bureau statistics.

Transportation

New York has one of the most extensive and one of the oldest transportation infrastructures in the country. Engineering challenges posed by the complex terrain of the state and the unique infrastructural issues of New York City brought on by urban crowding have had to be overcome perennially. Population expansion of the state has followed the path of the early waterways, first the Hudson River and Mohawk River, then the Erie Canal. In the 19th century, railroads were constructed along the river valleys, followed by the New York State Thruway in the 20th century.

The New York State Department of Transportation (NYSDOT) is the department of the government of New York responsible for the development and operation of highways, railroads, mass transit systems, ports, waterways, and aviation facilities within the State of New York. The NYSDOT is headquartered at 50 Wolf Road in Colonie, Albany County. The Port Authority of New York and New Jersey (PANYNJ) is a joint venture between the states of New York and New Jersey and authorized by the U.S. Congress, established in 1921 through an interstate compact, that oversees much of the regional transportation infrastructure, including bridges, tunnels, airports, and seaports, within the geographical jurisdiction of the Port of New York and New Jersey. This  port district is generally encompassed within a  radius of the Statue of Liberty National Monument. The Port Authority is headquartered at 4 World Trade Center in Lower Manhattan.

In addition to the well known New York City Subway system—which is confined within New York City—four suburban commuter railroad systems enter and leave the city: the Long Island Rail Road, Metro-North Railroad, Port Authority Trans-Hudson, and five of New Jersey Transit's rail lines. The New York City Department of Transportation (NYCDOT) is the agency of the government of New York City responsible for the management of much of New York City's own transportation infrastructure. Other cities and towns in New York have urban and regional public transportation. In Buffalo, the Niagara Frontier Transportation Authority runs the Buffalo Metro Rail light-rail system; in Rochester, the Rochester Subway operated from 1927 until 1956, but fell into disuse as state and federal investment went to highways.

The New York State Department of Motor Vehicles (NYSDMV or DMV) is the governmental agency responsible for registering and inspecting automobiles and other motor vehicles, as well as licensing drivers in the State of New York. , the NYSDMV has 11,284,546 drivers licenses on file and 10,697,644 vehicle registrations in force. All gasoline-powered vehicles registered in the State of New York are required to have an emissions inspection every 12 months, in order to ensure that environmental quality controls are working to prevent air pollution. Diesel-powered vehicles with a gross weight rating over 8,500 pounds that are registered in most Downstate New York counties must get an annual emissions inspection. All vehicles registered in the State of New York must get an annual safety inspection.

Portions of the transportation system are intermodal, allowing travelers to switch easily from one mode of transportation to another. One of the most notable examples is AirTrain JFK which allows rail passengers to travel directly to terminals at John F. Kennedy International Airport as well as to the underground New York City Subway system.

Government

The Government of New York embodies the governmental structure of the State of New York as established by the New York State Constitution. It is composed of three branches: executive, legislative, and judicial.

The governor is the state's chief executive and is assisted by the lieutenant governor. Both are elected on the same ticket. Additional elected officers include the attorney general and the comptroller. The secretary of state, formerly an elected officer, is currently appointed by the governor.

The New York State Legislature is bicameral and consists of the New York State Senate and the New York State Assembly. The state assembly consists of 150 members, while the state senate varies in its number of members, currently having 63. The legislature is empowered to make laws, subject to the governor's power to veto a bill. However, the veto may be overridden by the legislature if there is a two-thirds majority in favor of overriding in each house. The permanent laws of a general nature are codified in the Consolidated Laws of New York.

The highest court of appeal in the Unified Court System is the Court of Appeals whereas the primary felony trial court is the County Court (or the Supreme Court in New York City). The New York Supreme Court also acts as the intermediate appellate court for many cases, and the local courts handle a variety of other matters including small claims, traffic ticket cases, and local zoning matters, and are the starting point for all criminal cases.

The state is divided into counties, cities, towns, and villages, all of which are municipal corporations with respect to their own governments, as well as various corporate entities that serve single purposes that are also local governments, such as school districts, fire districts, and New York state public-benefit corporations, frequently known as authorities or development corporations. Each municipal corporation is granted varying home rule powers as provided by the New York Constitution. The state also has 10 Indian reservations. There have been several movements regarding secession from the state of New York. Proposals have included a state of Long Island, consisting of everything on the island outside New York City; a state called Niagara, the western counties of the state of New York; the northern counties of the state of New York called Upstate New York; making the city of New York a state; a proposal for a new Peconic County on eastern Long Island; and for the borough of Staten Island to secede from New York City.

In a 2020 study, New York was ranked as the 17th easiest state for citizens to vote in.

Capital punishment

Capital punishment was reintroduced in 1995 under the Pataki administration, but the statute was declared unconstitutional in 2004, when the New York Court of Appeals ruled in People v. LaValle that it violated the state constitution. The remaining death sentence was commuted by the court to life imprisonment in 2007, in People v. John Taylor, and the death row was disestablished in 2008, under executive order from Governor David Paterson. No execution has taken place in New York since 1963. Legislative efforts to amend the statute have failed, and death sentences are no longer sought at the state level, though certain crimes that fall under the jurisdiction of the federal government are subject to the federal death penalty.

Federal representation

New York is represented by Chuck Schumer and Kirsten Gillibrand in the United States Senate. There are twenty-six congressional districts, the nation's fourth highest number of congressional districts, behind California's 52, Texas's 38, and Florida's 28. As of 2023, fifteen districts are represented by members of the Democratic Party, while eleven are represented by Republicans. Representation was reduced from 27 in 2023 due to the state's slower overall population growth relative to the overall national population growth. New York has 28 electoral votes in national presidential elections, a drop from its peak of 47 votes from 1933 to 1953.

The state has a strong imbalance of payments with the federal government. According to the Office of the New York State Comptroller, the State of New York received 91 cents in services for every $1 it sent in taxes to the U.S. federal government in the 2013 fiscal year; New York ranked in 46th place in the federal balance of payments to the state on a per capita basis.

Politics

As of April 2016, Democrats represented a plurality of voters in the State of New York, constituting more than twice as many registered voters as any other political party affiliation or lack thereof. Since the second half of the 20th century, New York has generally supported candidates belonging to the Democratic Party in national elections. Democratic presidential candidate Barack Obama won the State of New York by over 25 percentage points in both 2012 and 2008. New York City, as well as the state's other major urban locales, including Albany, Buffalo, Rochester, Yonkers, and Syracuse, are significant Democratic strongholds, with liberal politics. Rural portions of upstate New York, however, are generally more conservative than the cities and tend to favor Republicans. Heavily populated suburban areas downstate, such as Westchester County and Long Island, were solidly Republican until the 1990s, and have since shifted to primarily supporting the Democratic Party.

New York City is the most important source of political fundraising in the United States for both major parties. Four of the top five zip codes in the nation for political contributions are in Manhattan. The top zip code, 10021 on the Upper East Side, generated the most money for the 2000 presidential campaigns of both George W. Bush and Al Gore.

The State of New York has the distinction of being the home state for both major-party nominees in three presidential elections. The 1904 presidential election saw former New York Governor and incumbent President Theodore Roosevelt face Alton B. Parker, chief judge of the New York Court of Appeals. The 1944 presidential election had Franklin D. Roosevelt, following in his cousin Theodore's footsteps as former New York Governor and incumbent president running for re-election against then-current New York Governor Thomas E. Dewey. In the 2016 presidential election, former United States Senator from New York Hillary Clinton, a resident of Chappaqua, was the Democratic Party nominee. The Republican Party nominee was businessman Donald Trump, a resident of Manhattan and a native of Queens.

New York City is an important center for international diplomacy. The United Nations headquarters has been situated on the East Side of Midtown Manhattan since 1952.

Sports

The State of New York is geographically home to one National Football League team, the Buffalo Bills, based in the Buffalo suburb of Orchard Park. Although the New York Giants and New York Jets represent the New York City metropolitan area and were previously located in New York City, they play in MetLife Stadium, located in East Rutherford, New Jersey. New York also has two Major League Baseball teams, the New York Yankees (based in the Bronx) and the New York Mets (based in Queens). Minor league baseball teams also play in the State of New York, including the Long Island Ducks, and the Brooklyn Cyclones, downstate, and the Rochester Red Wings, the Binghamton Rumble Ponies, the Syracuse Mets, the Auburn Doubledays, the Batavia Muckdogs, the Hudson Valley Renegades and the Buffalo Bisons upstate.

New York is home to three National Hockey League franchises: the New York Rangers in Manhattan, the New York Islanders in Nassau County on Long Island, and the Buffalo Sabres in Buffalo. New York has two National Basketball Association teams, the New York Knicks in Manhattan, and the Brooklyn Nets in Brooklyn and a Women's National Basketball Association team, the New York Liberty, also based in Brooklyn. New York is the home of a Major League Soccer franchise, New York City FC, currently playing in the Bronx. Although the New York Red Bulls represent the New York City metropolitan area, they play in Red Bull Arena in Harrison, New Jersey.

New York hosted the 1932 and 1980 Winter Olympics at Lake Placid. The 1980 Games are known for the USA–USSR ice hockey match dubbed the "Miracle on Ice", in which a group of American college students and amateurs defeated the heavily favored Soviet national ice hockey team 4–3 and went on to win the gold medal against Finland. Along with St. Moritz, Switzerland and Innsbruck, Austria, Lake Placid is one of the three cities to have hosted the Winter Olympic Games twice. New York City bid for the 2012 Summer Olympics but lost to London. The annual United States Open Tennis Championships is one of the world's four Grand Slam tennis tournaments and is held at the National Tennis Center in Flushing Meadows–Corona Park in Queens. The Belmont Stakes, part of the Triple Crown of Thoroughbred Racing, is held at Belmont Park in Nassau County on Long Island.

Several U.S. national sports halls of fame are or have been situated in New York. The National Baseball Hall of Fame and Museum is located in Cooperstown, Otsego County. The National Museum of Racing and Hall of Fame in Saratoga Springs, Saratoga County, honors achievements in the sport of thoroughbred horse racing. The physical facility of the National Soccer Hall of Fame in Oneonta, also in Otsego County, closed in 2010, although the organization itself has continued inductions.

The state of New York is also home to many intercollegiate division1 sports programs. The State University of New York's flagship University at Buffalo are the Buffalo Bulls. Syracuse University's intercollegiate teams are the Syracuse Orange.

See also 

 Index of New York (state)-related articles
 Outline of New York
 List of New York area codes

Notes

References

Further reading

External links 
 New York State Guide, from the Library of Congress
 
 

 
1788 establishments in the United States
Articles containing video clips
Northeastern United States
States and territories established in 1788
States of the East Coast of the United States
States of the United States
Contiguous United States